George Meggott (1669–1723), of Stoney Lane, St. Olave's, Southwark, was an English politician.

He was a Member (MP) of the Parliament of England for Southwark in 1722–1723.

References

1669 births
1723 deaths
People from Southwark
British MPs 1722–1727